Laura's woodland warbler (Phylloscopus laurae) is a species of Old World warbler in the family Phylloscopidae.
It is found in Angola, Democratic Republic of the Congo, Tanzania, and Zambia.

Its natural habitats are subtropical or tropical dry forests and subtropical or tropical swamps.

References

Laura's woodland warbler
Birds of Central Africa
Laura's woodland warbler
Taxonomy articles created by Polbot